Claus Zundel, also known as The Brave is a German composer, songwriter, producer and pianist. He has created several worldwide successful musical projects, most notable Sacred Spirit and B-Tribe (sold 20 million. copies combined), as well as more Indie projects such as "Moroccan Spirit", "Classical Spirit", "Divine Works", Ancient Spirit and his latest project "Tango Jointz".

After being a successful producer in the 1980s with a German artist named Hubert Kah, Zundel  produced several pop albums under Circa Records U.K between 1988 and 1992 for Sydney Youngblood. The most successful hit was "If Only I Could," which entered the top 3 in the charts of most European countries, including the UK. Zundel signed to the new label Circa Records run by Ashley Newton and Ray Cooper, later responsible for the huge success of the Spice Girls before they became executives of Virgin USA. All of the Youngblood records were distributed under Virgin Records U.K. The first album Feeling Free included several hit singles that reached gold status in countries throughout Europe. The success of the Youngblood project opened the door for Zundel into the international music world.

His music style is usually called as "The Brave Sound" as it considers a large number of music styles mixed in his special way. He often collaborates with musicians and singers from around the world and creates "The Brave Sound" projects with them.

Biography

The native of Heidelberg concentrated on R&B music in the 1980s, producing three tracks for Chaka Khan (who had moved to Germany) and several popular European artists in the 1980s. Tired of the fast pace, he moved to Ibiza, Spain in late 80s.

His co-producers were Ralf Hamm and Markus Staab who joined him in 1988. In 1990, they recorded as BSOG with featured vocals by Elaine Hudson. They released a single "Bow Wow Wow," with additional tracks Wam Bam and Cooler Moments Of Vivaldi.

Overtaken by flamenco, Zundel amassed 250 hours of these types of performances. Soon after he created his first own successful musical project: B-Tribe ("Barcelona Tribe of Soulsters"). With the first album Fiest Fatal !, B-Tribe hit charts all over the world. Five more albums followed with total sales of over 5 million copies.

At the same time, in 1995 Zundel created his second multi-million selling project — Sacred Spirit. The album Chants and Dances of Native Americans received multi-platinum awards from RIAA and sold 7 million. In 2001, with More Chants and Dances of Native Americans album he got a Grammy award nomination for Best New Age Album.

Other related projects include Divine Works (1996) (which became a notable dance hit with "Ancient Person of My Heart" single), Ancient Spirit (1997) and One Little Creature. Some of these are getting difficult to obtain. However, a number of tracks from the Divine Works album are on the newer Classical Spirit album (2003) — a collection of five famous classical pieces remixed by Claus, as well as five of his own compositions. Moroccan Spirit album (a "The Brave" mix of Moroccan native songs, recorded by Zundel himself during his five-month trip to Morocco) was released in 2002 and was a commercial success. The Brave also produced the Rose Moore album Spirit Of Silence in 2002. In February 2007 a new Zundel produced album was released worldwide — Palermo Nuevo — under project name Tango Jointz. Named after the cosmopolitan cultural and musical hotspot in Buenos Aires, this album is a collection of musical offerings combining traditional tango sounds and Latin rhythms with electronic beats.

Discography

Albums produced/written 

Sydney Youngblood - Just the Way it Is 1993 
B-Tribe - Fiesta Fatal (Warner/Atlantic) 1994
Sacred Spirit - Chants And Dances Of The Native Americans (Virgin) 1995
B-Tribe - Suave Suave (Atlantic) 1995
Ancient Spirit (1997)
Sacred Spirit - Culture Clash (Virgin) 1997, re-released as Indigo Spirit in 2000 on Higher Octave Music
Divine Works - Soundtrack for the New Millennium (Virgin) 1997
Divine Works - Ancient Person Of My Heart (Virgin) 1997 (CD, Maxi-Single and as 12" vinyl)
B-Tribe - Sensual Sensual (Atlantic) 1998
One Little Creature - Music of Fading Cultures - Pieces of Time (Virgin/Phantom) 1998
Hubert Kah - Rosemarie 1999 
Sacred Spirit - More Chants And Dances Of The Native Americans (Higher Octave/Virgin) 2000
Ancient Spirits for a New Age - 5-CD Box Set
B-Tribe - Spiritual Spiritual (Higher Octave) 2001
Moroccan Spirit - Moroccan Spirit (Higher Octave) 2002
Rose Moore - Spirit of Silence 2002
Classical Spirit - Classical Spirit (Higher Octave) 2003
B-Tribe - 5 (Higher Octave) 2003
Sacred Spirit - Jazzy Chill Out (Higher Octave) 2003
Sacred Spirit - Bluesy Chill Out (Higher Octave) 2003
Tango Jointz - Palermo Nuevo (La Escondida) 2007
Macao Cafe -presents b-tribe 6 (macaocafemusic)2007
Holophone presents B-TRIBE 6 (Holophone) 2008

Singles produced/written

Raw Pulse - No Brothershit (Based On Take Five) 1994 
B-Tribe - Fatal Fatal
B-Tribe - Nanita
B-Tribe - Que Mala Vida

References

External links
Fansite

Living people
German pianists
German record producers
Year of birth missing (living people)
German trance musicians
21st-century pianists